Accident is a 1928 German short film directed by Ernő Metzner.

Plot

The film centers on the struggles of a German citizen who happens upon a counterfeit coin lying in a gutter. The opening sequence of the movie gives a brief glimpse into the notion that the coin might be "cursed," as another passerby is struck down by a car while reaching for the coin in the middle of the road. Although the finder of the coin is at first glad, he soon regrets ever having picked it up.

Cast
Heinrich Gotho

Sybille Schmitz

Han Ruys

Heinrich Falconi

References

External links

German black-and-white films
Films of the Weimar Republic
German silent short films
German crime drama films
1928 crime drama films
1928 short films
Films directed by Ernő Metzner
1920s German-language films
Silent drama films
1920s German films